Larry Thomas Bell (born January 17, 1952) is an American composer, pianist and music professor.

Education
Bell was born in Wilson, North Carolina. He began his music studies with piano lessons and soon after began playing in a rock band.  He attended East Carolina University and Appalachian State University, where he worked with Gregory Kosteck and earned his Bachelor of Music degree in 1974. He then moved to New York, where he attended The Juilliard School, completing his Master of Music degree in 1977 and a Doctor of Musical Arts degree in 1982. While there he studied composition with Vincent Persichetti and Roger Sessions. A Guggenheim Fellowship (1981), Rome Prize (1982–3), and a Rockefeller grant (1985) took him to Italy, to study, write music, and take piano lessons with Joseph Rollino. On January 2, 1982, he married musicologist Andrea Olmstead.

Teaching appointments
Bell began teaching while in college, at the Juilliard Pre-College division (1979–1983).  Since then he has been a faculty member of The Boston Conservatory (1980–2005), the New England Conservatory (1992–2018), and the Berklee College of Music (since 2007).  Students have praised him "for his superlative teaching abilities, his talent for making complex issues understandable, his thoughtful approaches for gaining mastery of difficult skills, his wide-ranging musical knowledge, his musicianship, his patience, and his constant encouragement.". His composition students include Cynthia Wong, Forrest Eimold, George Li, Laura Schwindinger, Russ Grazier, Daniel Kharatian and Martin Matalon.

Piano performance
As a pianist, Bell performs his music regularly and has championed works by American composers. He has given recitals throughout the United States, as well as in Italy, Austria, and Japan. He is frequently heard on Boston's WGBH (FM) radio, where he played on their first live broadcast on the World Wide Web of his trio Mahler in Blue Light. He has performed as soloist on recordings of his Piano Concerto and Piano Sonata, and as an assisting artist on the recordings River of Ponds (the complete cello music), The Book of Moonlight (the complete violin music), Larry Bell Vocal Music, and Larry Bell: In the Garden of Dreams.  One reviewer called his playing "commendable–-not flashy, but brimming with musicality, intelligence, and desire to communicate. Tone quality was fetching and finger technique clean.”

Awards and residencies
Besides the Rome Prize and fellowships from the Guggenheim and Rockefeller Foundations, he was awarded the Charles Ives Prize from the American Academy of Arts and Letters and grants from the American Music Center, the American Symphony Orchestra League, and Meet the Composer. He has been a resident composer at Bennington College, the Woodstock/Fringe Festival, the American Academy in Rome, the Virginia Center for the Creative Arts, the Bellagio Study and Conference Center, the Rivers School Conservatory, the Hartt School, and the MacDowell Colony.

Musical style
Influenced by Beethoven, Carter, and solfège pedagogue Renée Longy, his modernist early compositions (from the 1970s and 1980s) emphasized thematic development, polyphony, and elaborate polyrhythmic structures.  In those years he began his performing career as a pianist and reconnected with American folk hymnody. Both of these choices led to a more tonal, melodically oriented, neo-Romantic style.

In more recent years, his speed of composition and frequency of piano performances have increased, resulting in multi-movement keyboard pieces in Baroque and classical forms, as well as works for orchestra and chorus, chamber music, solo keyboard music, and song cycles. By 2021 he had produced 174 works with opus numbers, many released on CD. His music has been performed by the Seattle Symphony and the Atlanta Symphony Orchestra and under conductors Gerard Schwarz, Jorge Mester, and Benjamin Zander; by the Juilliard and Borromeo String Quartets, and Speculum Musicae; cellists Eric Bartlett and Andrés Díaz; pianists Sara David Buechner and Jonathan Bass; and singers Robert Honeysucker, Matthew DiBattista, Thomas Gregg, and D’Anna Fortunato.

All aspects of Bell's music are synthesized in his two-act opera Holy Ghosts, which was premiered in 2009. Scored for a rock band, incorporating nine hymn tunes, and based on Romulus Linney's play, it combined Bell's Pentecostal Holiness background with his keyboard, vocal writing, and conducting skills.

Vocal music
Besides his opera Holy Ghosts, Bell has written many other works for vocal ensemble, solo voice, and vocal chamber music.  An early piece for vocal ensemble is his SSATB quintet Domination of Black from 1971, a student work on a text by Wallace Stevens. His first solo vocal work, an extended piece for soprano and piano, is Reality is an Activity of the Most August Imagination (1976), another setting of a text by Wallace Stevens.  A usual pairing of voice and instrument solos is found in his double concerto, The Idea of Order at Key West, op. 13 (1979–81) a work for soprano and violin soloists, large string orchestra, and percussion battery, also based on a poem by Wallace Stevens.  More recently, he has composed sets of songs on texts by Emily Dickinson, William Shakespeare, and Thomas Campion.  His most ambitious work for voices is The Seasons op. 101, a cantata consisting of four cycles of songs with texts by Elizabeth Kirschner.  The work begins with Fall: Autumnal Raptures, for tenor and harp; followed by Winter: Exaltations of Snowy Stars, for mezzo-soprano and piano; then Spring: In the Pendulum of My Body, for baritone and harpsichord; and finally Summer: The Vanishing Dew, for soprano and guitar.  The entire work is summed up in the Finale: Echolocations of Cellos, a single-movement work for all eight performers.

Instrumental music
Bell has composed works for many different instruments and instrumental combinations.  Among his early works are Novelette for string quartet (1970), Mirage for flute and piano (1971), Eclogue for saxophone quartet (1973), his first String Quartet (1973), and Caprice for solo 'cello (1979).  His noteworthy mature works include three string quartets, Harmonium, op. 48 (1997) for brass quintet, Quintessence, op. 39 (1993) for woodwind quintet, Tarab, op. 66 (2003) for double cello quartet, a series of Caprices for solo instruments, and Serenades for various instrumental ensembles.  Several recent instrumental pieces have featured standard Baroque instrumental combinations, especially for the alto recorder and 'cello, with or without accompaniment.

Music for orchestra and band
Among Bell's early works is Continuum, a student work for chamber orchestra (1971).  A Piano Concerto was completed in 1989, followed by a Short Symphony for Band a decade later.  Later orchestral works have added a children's chorus (Songs of Innocence and Experience) or a narrator (Hansel and Gretel).

Keyboard music
Bell has composed many works for piano, harpsichord or organ.  One of his earliest piano works is a set of Variations from 1974, first performed at Juilliard. His more recent projects for keyboard have been larger sets of inventions, preludes or partitas, in the manner of Baroque works for harpsichord.  He has also written a set of Etudes for student pianists to work on technical issues.

Selected works

Large Instrumental works
Op. 13, The Idea of Order at Key West (text by Wallace Stevens), double concerto, soprano, violin, orch, 1981
Op. 23, Sacred Symphonies (Symphony no. 1), 1985
Op. 33, Piano Concerto, 1989
Op. 40, Idumea Symphony: Symphony no. 2, 1996
Op. 44 Song and Dance, divertimento for chamber orchestra, 1997
Op. 45, Sentimental Muse, bassoon concerto, 1997
Op. 47, Short Symphony for Band(Symphony no. 3), 1999
Op. 55, Songs of Innocence and Experience (texts by William Blake), children's chorus, orch, 2000
Op. 59, Hansel and Gretel (texts by the Brothers Grimm), narrator and orch, 2001
Op. 68, Spirituals, chamber symphony for ten players, 2004
Op. 70, The Triumph of Lightness, concerto for 'cello and orchestra, 2011
Op. 77, Dark Orange Concerto, viola and winds, 2005
Op. 80, Chorale Prelude: Holy Ghosts, wind ensemble, 2005
Op. 89, David and Old Ironsides, narrator and orchestra (text: Constance Leeds)
Op. 120, Songs of Reconciliation, soprano and orchestra (also for soprano and piano) (text: Tran Nhan Tong and Walt Whitman), 2013
Op. 133, Remembering Fay, trumpet and orchestra, 2015
Op. 153, Harmony in Blue and Silver, wind ensemble, 2018

Stage
Op. 90, Holy Ghosts (libretto by R. Linney and A. Olmstead), 2008

Instrumental solo and chamber music
Op. 5, Eclogue, saxophone quartet AATB, 1973
Op. 6, String Quartet no.1, 1973
Op. 16, String Quartet no.2, 1982
Op. 17, Fantasia on an Imaginary Hymn, vc, va, 1983
Op. 25, River of Ponds, vc, pf, 1986
Op. 28, The Black Cat (text by Edgar Allan Poe), narator, vc, pf, 1987
Op. 31, The Book of Moonlight, vn, pf, 1987
Op. 32, Concerto for Oboe and Five Instruments, oboe solo, violin, viola, cello, double bass, and piano, 1988
Op. 35, Late Night Thoughts on Listening to Mahler's Ninth Symphony, narrator/violin and piano (text: Lewis Thomas), 1991
Op. 36, Piano Quartet, 1991
Op. 38a, What Goes Around Comes Around, flute, oboe, clarinet, viola, cello, and piano, 1991
Op. 39, Quintessence, wind quintet, 1993
Op. 41, Four Pieces in Familiar Style, two violins, 1994
Op. 43, Mahler in Blue Light, a sax, vc, pf; arr. for cl, vc, pf, 1996
Op. 48, Harmonium, brass quintet, 1998
Op. 54 Caprice No. 3, alto recorder, 2001
Op. 60, Four Lyrics, trumpet and piano, 2001
Op. 62, Just As I Am, violin and piano, 2002
Op. 66, Tarab, double 'cello quartet, 2003
Op. 71, String Quartet no.3, “Homage to Beethoven,” 2004
Op. 74, Pop Set, double bass and piano, 2005
Op. 75, Caprice no. 7, vibraphone/narrator (text: Echo and Narcissus from Ovid), 2005
Op. 76, Dark Orange Partita, viola solo, 2005
Op. 84, Serenade no. 1, guitar trio, 2006
Op. 85, Poems, trumpet and piano, 2006
Op. 88, Unchanging Love, brass quintet, org, 2007
Op. 98, Serenade No. 2, alto recorder, harpsichord, 'cello, 2009
Op. 107, Baroque Concerto, alto recorder, harpsichord, 'cello, string orchestra, 2010
Op. 110, Cello Suite with Harpsichord Figured Bass, 2010
Op. 111, Serenade no. 3, trumpet, tenor saxophone, and piano, 2010
Op. 112, Serenade no. 4, clarinet, violin, and piano, 2011
Op. 122, Dazzling Duo, tenor saxophone and piano, 2013
Op. 130, Second Elegy, trumpet and piano, 2015
Op. 134, Song of the Open Road, alto saxophone and strings, 2014
Op. 138, Newtown Variations, viola and piano, 2016
Op. 141, Serenade no. 5, clarinet choir, 2016
Op. 151, Sonata Sacre, baroque flute and harpsichord, 2017
Op. 155, Dona Nobis Pacem, string quartet, 2017
Op. 157, Clearing the Clouds from Our Minds, 5 percussion instruments, 6 players, 2018

Solo vocal music
Op. 8, Reality is an Activity of the Most August Imagination, mezzo-soprano and piano (text: Wallace Stevens), 1975
Op. 19, Incident, baritone and piano (text: Countee Cullen), 1984
Op. 20, Four Sacred Songs, soprano and piano, 1984
Op. 50, The Immortal Beloved (L. van Beethoven) mezzo-soprano and pinao, 1999
Op. 53, Ten Poems of William Blake, soprano and piano (text: William Blake), 2000
Op. 58, Shakespeare Sonnets, op. 58, tenor or soprano and piano, 2001
Sonnet No. 128 “How oft when thou, my music, music playst” 
Sonnet No. 29 “When, in disgrace with Fortune and men’s eyes”  
Sonnet No. 145 “Those lips that Love’s own hand did make”  
Sonnet No. 18 “Shall I compare thee to a summer's day?
Op. 64, Songs of Time and Eternity (E. Dickinson), soprano and piano, 2002
Op. 79, Dream within a Dream (W. Whitman, W. Blake, E.A. Poe, E. Dickinson, M. Arnold), soprano and piano, 2006
Op. 101, The Seasons (E. Kirschner) cant., of 20 duets, T, hp; Mez, pf; Bar, hpd; S, gui, 2010
Op. 104, Psalm 23 op. 104, high voice, organ, 2014
Op. 117, Fancies, op. 117 (Thomas Campion), T, pf., 2012
Oft have I sigh’d for him
Turn back you wanton flyer
Come, O come, my life's delight
The cypress curtain of the night
Beauty, since you so much desire
Op. 119, The Book of Blues, baritone and piano (text: Larry Bell), 2011
Op. 125, At the River, soprano solo and orchestra (also for soprano and piano), 2014
Three Responses, tenor, baritone, organ, 2016
Op. 136, The OverSoul (Ralph Waldo Emerson)
Op. 139, The Idea of Democracy (Abraham Lincoln)
Op. 140, Is not this the fast that I have chosen? (Bible Isiah 58: 6–12)
Op. 137, Water Music, baritone, double bass, and piano (text: Langston Hughes), 2016
Op. 149, Gaslight, baritone and piano (text: Larry Bell), 2017
Op. 154, The Lone Wild Bird, alto and piano, 2018
Op. 158, Domenica a Filicudi, soprano, viola, and piano (text: Deborah Collins), 2019
Op. 159' Halcyon Song, voice, cello, and piano (text: Larry Bell), 2019
Op. 173, Parables of Love and Death, song cycle for alto and tenor soloists and piano (text: Emily Dickinson), 2021

Vocal ensemble and choral music
Op. 2, Domination of Black, five solo voices SSATB (text: Wallace Stevens), 1971
Op. 14, Prologue and The End of the World, chorus SATB (texts: Archibald MacLeish), 1981
Op. 42, A Cry Against the Twilight, madrigal for 5 voices, SSATB (text: Wallace Stevens), 1995
Op. 87, Chorale Fantasia on Unchanging Love, soprano, alto, tenor, and bass soli, chorus and piano (text: Romulus Linney), 2008
Op. 144, Once to Every Soul and Nation, SSA choir (text: James Russell Lowell), 2017
Op. 147, Mass A6, six voices SSSAAA, 2017
Op. 160, Awake Our Souls, Away our Fears, congregational singers, brass quintet, and organ (text: Isaac Watts), 2019
Op. 169, A Hymnbook for Congregational Singing, 2019
Op. 170, Symphony No. 4, soprano, tenor, baritone soloists, SATB chorus, organ (texts: Psalm 96, Psalm 1, Psalm 23, Psalm 150 King James Bible), 2020
Op. 172, The Bell, cantata for soprano solo, SATB chorus, violin, flute, and cello (text: R. W. Emerson), 2020

Keyboard music
Op. 7, Variations, piano, 1974
Op. 10, Grand Sonata, piano four hands, 1977
Op. 15, Miniature Diversions, piano, 1983
Op. 21, Revivals, piano, 1984
Op. 26, The Evangelical, two pianos four hands, 1986
Op. 30, The Parable of the Parabola, piano, 1988
Op. 34, Piano Sonata no.1, piano, 1990
Op. 37, Blues Theme with Variations, two pianos four hands, 1992
Op. 46, Reminiscences and Reflections, 12 preludes and fugues, piano, 1993-1998
Op. 61, Piano Sonata no. 2, “Tâla,” 2003
Op. 67, Four Chorale Preludes, piano, 2003
Op. 69, Liturgical Suite, organ, 2004
Op. 72, Elegy, piano, 2005
Op. 82, Music of the Spheres, piano, 2006
Op. 83, Piano Sonata no. 3 Sonata Macabre, piano, 2006
Op. 96, 15 2-Part Inventions, piano, 2008
Op. 97, Partita no.1, harpsichord, 2009
Op. 102, Partita no.2, harpsichord, 2010
Op. 109, Piano Etudes Book 1, piano, 2010
Op. 116, Lyric Preludes, piano, 2011
Op. 118, Preludes sans Mesurés avec Fugues, harpsichord, 2012
Op. 123, First Piano Sonatina, piano, 2014
Op. 124, Gathering Music, organ, 2014
Op. 127, Fifteen Three-Part Sinfonias, piano, 2015
Op. 132, Nine Variations on We Shall Overcome, piano, 2015
Op. 132a, Nine Variations on We Shall Overcome, organ, 2016
Op. 135, First Book of Prayers, piano, 2015
Op. 143, First Harpsichord Sonata, harpsichord, 2017
Op. 145, Canons for the Young, piano, 2017
Op. 146, Piano Etudes Book 2: 12 Polyrhythmic Studies, piano, 2017-2020
Op. 148, Prelude and Fugue in f minor, organ, 2017
Op. 150, Prelude and Fugue in d minor, organ, 2017
Op. 156, Twenty-Four Preludes and Fugues, piano, 2018-2019
Op. 165, Piano Sonata no. 4, piano, 2020
Op. 166, Piano Sonata no. 5, A Landscape of Small Ruins, piano, 2020
Op. 168, Terza Rima, 12 Variations on “Awake our Souls, Away our Fears,” piano, 2020
Op. 171, Piano Sonata no. 6, piano, 2020
Op. 174, Piano Sonata no. 7 Southern Meditations, piano, 2021

Recordings

Recordings are available for a significant proportion of Bell's compositions.  Several discs have been released that are devoted entirely to his works, while various individual pieces can be found on other recording devoted to American modern music.

Publications
.
.

Footnotes

References
.
.

External links
 Berklee College website
 Larry Thomas Bell website
 opera Holy Ghosts’ website

Living people
1952 births
20th-century American composers
20th-century American pianists
21st-century American composers
21st-century American pianists
American male composers
American male pianists
American music educators
Appalachian State University alumni
Berklee College of Music faculty
Boston Conservatory at Berklee faculty
East Carolina University alumni
People from Wilson, North Carolina
Juilliard School alumni